Silkbank Limited, formerly known as Saudi-Pak Commercial Bank, is a Pakistani commercial bank which is based in Karachi, Pakistan. It has a branch network of 111 in 29 cities.

History

Prudential Commercial Bank Limited 
The bank was founded in 1994. It began commercial operations on May 7, 1995. It has a network of twenty branches.

Saudi-Pak Commercial Bank 
Saudi Pak Industrial and Agricultural Investment Company (Pvt) Ltd (SAPICO) acquired Prudential Commercial Bank Limited on September 15, 2001. The SAPICO gave the bank a new name: Saudi Pak Commercial Bank.

Silkbank Limited 
In March 2008, a consortium comprising International Finance Corporation, Bank of Muscat, Nomura and Sinthos Capital led by Pakistani banker Shaukat Tarin acquired a majority stake in Saudi Pak bank for $213 million. In June 2008, the bank changed its name to Silk Bank Limited.

Major Shareholding 
In 2015, Arif Habib Group acquired 28.23 percent stake in the bank.

Awards 
Silkbank was awarded Best Innovation in ‘Retail Banking Pakistan 2020’ at the International Bankers Awards.

References

Companies based in Karachi
Banks of Pakistan
Companies listed on the Pakistan Stock Exchange
Banks established in 1994
Pakistani companies established in 1994
Pakistani subsidiaries of foreign companies